Call Me If You Get Lost (stylized in all caps) is the sixth studio album by American rapper and producer Tyler, the Creator. The album was released on June 25, 2021, through Columbia Records. The album is narrated by DJ Drama and features guest appearances from 42 Dugg, YoungBoy Never Broke Again, Ty Dolla Sign, Lil Wayne, Domo Genesis, Brent Faiyaz, Lil Uzi Vert, Pharrell Williams, Teezo Touchdown, Fana Hues and Daisy World. Tyler produced the album himself, with additional production contributed by Jamie xx and Jay Versace.

The album marks a departure from the lighter and more soulful aesthetics of Igor (2019) and Flower Boy (2017) in favor of brash beats and raw rhymes, influenced by DJ Drama's Gangsta Grillz mixtape series. Genres on the album span hip hop, pop, jazz, soul and reggae. The cover art depicts an identification card for a character named "Tyler Baudelaire" in reference to the French poet Charles Baudelaire, whose work has been regarded by music journalists as comparable to the explicit nature and themes of Tyler's music.

Call Me If You Get Lost was supported by two singles: "Lumberjack" and "WusYaName", both of which were released alongside music videos. The album received widespread acclaim from critics and has been described as a mix of styles, with hints of nostalgia throughout its production. Some critics compared the album to his previous release, Igor. It was named among the best albums of 2021 by multiple publications' year-end lists. The album debuted at number one on the US Billboard 200, becoming Tyler, the Creator's second US number-one album. It won the award for Best Rap Album at the 2022 Grammy Awards, Tyler's second win.

Concept
The cover art depicts an identification card for a character named "Tyler Baudelaire" in reference to the French poet Charles Baudelaire. According to Matthew Ismael Ruiz of Pitchfork, "Baudelaire, the character Tyler plays throughout the album, is a proxy for Tyler's newfound worldliness—and his inability to leverage that sophistication into the relationship of his dreams." Charles Baudelaire's most famous work, 1857's Les Fleurs du mal, was "originally banned for being too explicit, and Baudelaire himself was prosecuted for indecency", similar to Tyler's evolution from an "angsty teen spewing filth for shock value into sensitive lover man with a mischievous streak". Luke Morgan Britton of NME also compared the two, saying that both "have been fixated on the struggle between romance and realism, luxury and love, beauty and death, talents and controversies."

Initially, when Tyler unveiled the cover art for Call Me If You Get Lost, people thought that he had taken inspiration from Ol' Dirty Bastard's 1995 album, Return to the 36 Chambers: The Dirty Version, when in actuality he had taken inspiration from "...old passport and travel cards from early 1900s".

Music

NMEs Luke Morgan Britton called Call Me If You Get Lost "an all-encompassing culmination of Tyler's ever-varying sound, showing that growth isn't always linear and that artists can be a multitude of things", further saying that the album cements Tyler's place as a "generational talent, one in fine form and continuing to push the boundaries of his vision and kaleidoscopic sound." The Guardians Alexis Petridis called the album's stylistic lurches both "unexpected and hugely impressive, the product of an artist with eclectic tastes and a disinclination to make music that fits in with prevalent trends." Petridis highlighted synth-pop, soul, reggae and jazz. The Financial Timess Ludovic Hunter-Tilney called the album's production "densely layered and quixotic", saying that "Lemonhead" switches from hard-hitting beats and a babble of voices into easy-listening bossa nova, while "Massa" switches a flute-led jazz routine into stripped-back hip hop.

In comparison to Igor, The Independents Roisin O'Connor said "the production here [on Call Me If You Get Lost] is as slick as Igor, though, there's less of a through line. Igor was the devastating pieced-together parts of a broken relationship. Call Me If You Get Lost plays fast and loose with its subjects, relying instead on the music itself to carry listeners through." According to Pitchforks Matthew Ismael Ruiz, Tyler is more "adept than ever at weaving different ideas into one cohesive song, rather than just smushing them together" on the album. Ruiz described Tyler's production as "toying with movement in the mix, bouncing sounds between left and right channels for an immersive headphones experience." While Call Me If You Get Lost has a very specific underlying narrative lyrically, Ruiz said that the production styles seem to tell the story of Tyler's whole career up to this point: post-Thundercat R&B, a Gravediggaz horrorcore sample, and a Salaam Remi flip comparable to the music of Kendrick Lamar. Ruiz called the album a return to rap following the pop sound of Igor, though notes that Tyler is also "clearly light years away from the skeletal productions of his first few records." Konstantinos Pappis of Our Culture Mag described the album's songs as having "cinematic grandeur and meticulous arrangements that have characterized Tyler's recent material". Pappis also noted that the sound is as "wondrously nostalgic" as they were on Flower Boy.

Craig Jenkins of Vulture also regarded the album as a step back into "the cranky, devil-may-care style and attitude of his [Tyler, the Creator's] early days" while also channelling "all the ways he's changed since then". Jenkins highlighted Call Me If You Get Lost as a departure from the "lighter and more soulful aesthetics of Igor in favor of brash beats and raw rhymes... somewhat after the Gangsta Grillz mixtapes of the aughts and early 2010s." Chris Deville of Stereogum found that Call Me If You Get Lost has influences of hip hop blockbuster albums, such as The Marshall Mathers LP (2000) and Tha Carter III (2008). Deville also said that "the sheer grandiosity" of the album – "the elaborate cinematic production, the insane cast of guest rappers" – is reminiscent of Kanye West's earlier music. Deville also notes that the samples from various 1990s rappers compare to the golden age of boom bap.

Themes 
Marcus Shorter of Consequence said of the album that self-awareness dominates its second half. Shorter further notes that romance is a prominent theme in the album's second half: "That journey includes heartbreak, because no Tyler, The Creator album is complete without romance." Shorter specifically describes "Wilshire": "He stumbles over words and mumbles parts of a sad story, sounding like someone not fully ready to handle the truth. On an album filled with dope lines from a guy who always says it with his chest, "Wilshire" is a rare moment where we feel him holding back. The ego is tucked into the closet for one song, further blurring the lines between the man, the persona, and the alter-ego."

Release and promotion
On June 9, 2021, a promotional billboard for the album's rollout was spotted in Los Angeles, which was followed by more sightings in other major cites around the world. The billboard read "Call Me If You Get Lost" and included the phone number, +1 (855) 444-8888. When called, a recorded message was played of a conversation between Tyler and his mother. That recording is in the album as the track "Momma Talk". Soon thereafter, a website was discovered that references the billboard and phone number, appearing to be another aspect of the album's promotion. On June 15, Tyler tweeted the phone number which was seen on billboards the week prior, confirming his involvement.

On June 14, 2021, Tyler teased new music in a short video titled "Side Street", featuring himself holding a dog while making out with a woman. There is also a cameo of fellow Odd Future member Taco Bennett closer to the end of the video. Tyler directed the video under the moniker of his alter-ego Wolf Haley. On June 16, 2021, Tyler released a song titled "Lumberjack", which was accompanied by a short music video, also directed by Tyler himself as Wolf Haley. The song samples the song "2 Cups of Blood" by Gravediggaz.

The following day, June 17, Tyler officially confirmed the album's title as Call Me If You Get Lost and announced a release date for June 25. He also announced the cover art and merchandise through his streetwear brand Golf Wang. On June 22, 2021, Tyler released the album's second single titled "WusYaName" featuring rapper YoungBoy Never Broke Again, also accompanied by a self-directed short music video. Employing elements from '90s-era R&B, this song samples H-Town's "Back Seat (Wit No Sheets)" and, unlike "Lumberjack", bears a close resemblance to his recent, more soulful albums. On June 23, 2021, Tyler released another teaser for the album in the form of a self-directed comedy sketch titled "Brown Sugar Salmon". The video features Tyler, referred to as "Sir Baudelaire", on a train attempting to order a meal without success.

Following the album's release on June 25, 2021, Tyler released a video to accompany the track "Juggernaut". Though it does include the guest verses from Lil Uzi Vert and Pharrell Williams, only Tyler himself appears in the video. On June 29, 2021, Tyler released a music video for "Corso". In the video, Tyler is performing at a birthday party in the company of DJ Drama. On July 8, 2021, Tyler released a music video for "Lemonhead". The video does not include the guest verse from 42 Dugg.

Tour
On August 3, 2021, Tyler announced the Call Me If You Get Lost Tour starting on February 8, 2022, in Phoenix at Footprint Center and concluding on August 3, 2022, in Melbourne at Rod Laver Arena. The North American leg with approximately 35 shows was supported by Kali Uchis, Vince Staples, and Teezo Touchdown. The concert in Los Angeles at Crypto.com Arena on March 31, 2022, was live streamed on Prime Video and Twitch.

Critical reception

Call Me If You Get Lost was met with widespread critical acclaim. At Metacritic, which assigns a normalized rating out of 100 to reviews from professional publications, the album received an average score of 88, based on 20 reviews. Aggregator AnyDecentMusic? gave it 8.4 out of 10, based on their assessment of the critical consensus.

The Independents Roisin O'Connor gave Call Me If You Get Lost five out of five stars, and said it feels like "the apotheosis of all Tyler's past works." They also noted the seamless transitions between tracks. Clash praised Tyler's "refusal to be caged in by any set sound or genre" and noted tracks "Sweet / I Thought You Wanted to Dance" and "Wilshire" as standouts. David Smyth of the Evening Standard mentioned the album's varied "global" sound and said, "Tyler's music is as fascinating as ever." Alexis Petridis of The Guardian wrote that bursts of "kaleidoscopic synth-pop, soul balladry and jazz sweep you", saying that the album could "take a lot of time to fully unpick, but clearly isn't going to diminish in quality if you do so." Ryan Rosenberger of The Line of Best Fit said, "Time will tell exactly where this album lands in Tyler, The Creator's discography, but Call Me If You Get Lost is yet another memorable record from Wolf Haley himself, one that only further cements his status as one of the best artists of his generation". Luke Morgan Britton from NME enjoyed the album, saying, "The iconoclast confronts cancel culture, his own controversial past and the notion of personal growth on a kaleidoscopic record that reaffirms his greatness". Pitchfork critic Paul A. Thompson said, "It grants him the freedom to play with tone, to write personally or use his gravelly voice as texture, to treat the harshest raps and the most delicate hooks as mad experiments gone wrong". Wesley McLean of Exclaim! said, "Tyler has delivered a project that yet again pushes the boundaries of his music while simultaneously being a culmination of everything that he's done so far. It's yet another impressive outing for an artist whose reign doesn't seem to be stopping any time soon".

Sofie Lindevall of Gigwise summarized: "With his sixth studio album Call Me If You Get Lost, Tyler turns everything up-side-down again, resulting in one of the most dynamic and interesting entries in his discography so far." A positive review by Craig Jenkins of Vulture concluded with telling the reader to "Look between the many detailed descriptions of Rolls-Royce interiors, beautiful boats, and international travel, beyond the over half-a-dozen mentions of passports," and that they'll find, "A love story". Paste magazine's Matt Mitchell gave Call Me If You Get Lost an 8.7 out of 10, and said the crowning achievement of the record is "the way it sharply reminds every listener that the early entries in an artist's discography are not parts of their past meant to be forgotten". Reviewing the album for AllMusic, David Crone claimed that, "Tyler's music has always been a patchwork of ever-increasing palettes, and CMIYGL is his most complex to date." Rolling Stones Jeff Ihaza summarised Tyler's effort as a maturing into "some of the more compelling rap music being made today", calling Call Me If You Get Lost Tyler's best work to date.

Rankings

Industry awards

Commercial performance
Call Me If You Get Lost debuted at number one on the US Billboard 200 chart, earning 169,000 album-equivalent units (including 55,000 copies in pure album sales) in its first week. This became Tyler's second US number-one album. The album also accumulated a total of 152.96 million on-demand streams of the album's tracks. It spent two non-consecutive weeks at number one, topping the chart for a second week the following April after the vinyl release. With 49,000 copies sold that week, it holds the largest vinyl sales week for a hip hop album. On February 22, 2022, the album was certified gold by the Recording Industry Association of America (RIAA) for combined sales and album-equivalent units of over 500,000 units in the United States.

Thirteen of the album's songs reached the US Billboard Hot 100, with "WusYaName" reaching the top 20 of the chart.

Track listing
All tracks are produced by Tyler, the Creator, except where noted.

Notes
 All track titles are stylized in all caps.
 "Lemonhead" features uncredited spoken word by Frank Ocean

Sample credits
  "Sir Baudelaire" contains excerpts from "Siesta", written and performed by Billy Cobham; and an uncredited sample of "Michael Irvin", performed by Westside Gunn.
  "Corso" contains excerpts from "Oriental Workload", written and performed by James Asher.
  "WusYaName" contains samples from "Back Seat (Wit No Sheets)", written by Bishop Burrell Sr., Solomon Conner, Delando Conner, and Darryl Jackson, performed by H-Town.
  "Lumberjack" contains excerpts from "Inner Crisis", written and performed by Larry Willis; samples from "2 Cups of Blood", written by Anthony Ian Berkeley, Arnold Hamilton, Paul Huston, and Robert Diggs, performed by Gravediggaz; and excerpts from "Hihache", performed by Lafayette Afro Rock Band.
  "Hot Wind Blows" contains excerpts from "Slow Hot Wind", written by Henry Mancini and Norman Gimbel, performed by Penny Goodwin.
 "Massa" contains excerpts from "If It's in You to do Wrong", performed by The Impressions.
  "Manifesto" contains samples from "I'm Gonna Love You Just a Little More Babe", written by Barry White, performed by Jimmy Smith.
  "Sweet / I Thought You Wanted to Dance" contains excerpts from "Is Anyone There?", performed by Hookfoot; and "Baby My Love", written by Fil Callender, performed by The In Crowd and Jah Stitch.
 "Safari" contains excerpts from "Farewell My Love", written by Marvin Redding and performed by Ebony Expressions.
  "Fishtail" contains excerpts from "Lessie", written by Alvin Worthy, Amber Croskey, Thomas Paladino, and Eliot Dudock, performed by Westside Gunn.

Personnel
Credits are adapted from the album's liner notes.

Musicians

 Fabian Chavez – flute (tracks 1, 6, 7, 11, 16)
 Devon "Jasper" Wilson – additional vocals (track 2)
 Lionel Boyce – additional vocals (tracks 2, 5)
 Vic Wainstein – additional vocals (track 2)
 Domo Genesis – additional vocals (track 5)
 Travis "Taco" Bennett – additional vocals (track 5)
 DJ Drama – hosting

Producers and engineers

 Tyler, the Creator – production (all tracks), recording (tracks 1–5, 7–8, 12–13, 16), executive production
 Jamie xx – production (track 12)
 Jay Versace – production (track 16)
 Vic Wainstein – recording (tracks 2–9, 12–16)
 Jason Goldberg – recording (track 4)
 Mike Larson – recording (track 14)
 Gregory Scott – assistance (tracks 2, 15)
 Ben Fletcher – assistance (tracks 3–5)
 Bobby Mota – assistance (tracks 4, 9)
 Jonathan Pfarr – assistance (tracks 4, 9)
 Josh Sellers – assistance (track 6)
 Robert N. Johnson – assistance (tracks 7, 16)
 Sam Morton – assistance (track 12)
 Neal H Pogue – mixing
 Zachary Acosta – mixing assistance
 Mike Bozzi – mastering

Artwork
 Darren Vongphakdy – art direction
 Wolf Haley – art direction
 Luis "Panch" Perez – cover photography

Charts

Weekly charts

Year-end charts

Certifications

References

External links
 Call Me If You Get Lost Official Website
 

2021 albums
Albums produced by Tyler, the Creator
Grammy Award for Best Rap Album
Tyler, the Creator albums